A  Reparation Order (aka Community reparation order) is a remedy available in UK courts for any juvenile (10 to 17 years old) who has been convicted of an offence. It has a two-fold aim:

"to take into account the feelings and wishes of the victims of crime;
to prevent the young offender from committing further offences by confronting them with the consequences of their criminal behaviour, and allowing them to make some amends."

References 

Sentencing (law)